Teodor Erik Zeron Runsiö (born 28 July 1995) is a Swedish child actor, well known for his role as Lasse in LasseMajas detektivbyrå. He has also played among Micke in the 2006 film Kidz in da Hood.

References

External links

1995 births
Swedish male child actors
Living people